Bangkok is subdivided into 50 districts (khet, also sometimes wrongly called amphoe as in the other provinces, derived from Pali khetta, cognate to Sanskrit kṣetra), which are further subdivided into 180 subdistricts (khwaeng), roughly equivalent to tambon in the other provinces.

See also
 Administrative divisions of Thailand

References

 
Districts, Bangkok
 List of
Districts